Girish Chandra Tripathi (G.C. Tripathi) is the Chairman of the Higher Education Council Uttar Pradesh. Previously, he has been the 26th Vice-Chancellor of Banaras Hindu University (27 November 2014 to 26 November 2017), and professor of Economics at the University of Allahabad.

See also 

 List of vice-chancellors of Banaras Hindu University
 Banaras Hindu University women's rights protest

References 

Banaras Hindu University
Vice Chancellors of Banaras Hindu University
Banaras Hindu University people
Year of birth missing (living people)
Living people